Étant donnés (Given: 1. The Waterfall, 2. The Illuminating Gas, French: Étant donnés: 1° la chute d'eau / 2° le gaz d'éclairage) is Marcel Duchamp's last major artwork, which surprised the art world because it believed he had given up art for competitive chess which he had been playing for almost 25 years, following a prolific art career. He had been making work with the Surrealists when he made The Bride Stripped Bare by Her Bachelors, Even (also known as The Large Glass). This work is a tableau, visible only through a pair of peepholes (one for each eye) in a wooden door, of a nude woman lying on her back with her face hidden, legs spread, holding a gas lamp in the air in one hand against a landscape backdrop.

Duchamp worked secretly on the piece from 1946 to 1966 in his Greenwich Village studio. It is composed of an old wooden door, nails, bricks, brass, aluminium sheet, steel binder clips, velvet, leaves, twigs, a female form made of parchment, hair, glass, plastic clothespins, oil paint, linoleum, an assortment of lights, a landscape composed of hand-painted and photographed elements and an electric motor housed in a cookie tin which rotates a perforated disc. The Brazilian sculptor Maria Martins, Duchamp's girlfriend from 1946 to 1951, served as the model for the female figure in the piece, and his second wife, Alexina (Teeny), served as the model for the figure's arm.
Duchamp prepared a "Manual of Instructions" in a 4-ring binder explaining and illustrating how to assemble and disassemble the piece. 

Anne d'Harnoncourt, a young curator at the Philadelphia Museum of Art and later its director, orchestrated the acquisition and transfer of the piece to Philadelphia. According to the artist's wishes that the work be installed and viewed after his death, Duchamp's widow Alexina Duchamp and his step-son Paul Matisse installed the work and made it available to the public at the Philadelphia Museum of Art in 1969, a year after Duchamp's death.

References and sources
References

Sources
Tomkins, Calvin. Duchamp: A Biography, Henry Holt and Company, Inc., 1996. 
Hulten, Pontus (editor): Marcel Duchamp: Work and Life, The MIT Press, 1993. 
Peep Show, The Smart Set, October 7, 2009
 Landscape of Eros, Through the Peephole, August 27, 2009,
Banz, Stefan, ed., Marcel Duchamp and the Forestay Waterfall, JRP|Ringier, Zurich.

External links
 Outside view of Etant donnés at the Philadelphia Museum of Art.
 Inside view of  Etant donnés

1966 sculptures
Marcel Duchamp works
Paintings in the collection of the Philadelphia Museum of Art
Nude art